Akiéni is a small town in Lekoni-Lekori Department in Haut-Ogooue in north-eastern Gabon. It lies along the road to Leconi and is set in a valley on the northern side of the Baniaka River. It is served by Akieni Airport.

Notable people
Jean-Boniface Assélé
Jean-Marie Adzé
Luc Marat Abila

References

External links
Satellite map

Populated places in Haut-Ogooué Province